Sir Thomas Coningsby (9 October 1550-30 May 1625) was an English soldier and Member of Parliament, notable for his diary of military action in France in 1591.

Birth
Thomas Coningsby was the son and heir of Humphrey Coningsby, of Hampton Court, Herefordshire, by Anne, daughter of Sir Thomas Inglefield, judge of the common pleas. His father, a gentleman-treasurer to Queen Elizabeth, was a grandson of Sir Humphrey Coningsby.

Early life and military service
Coningsby visited Italy with Sir Philip Sidney in 1573, and he was intimate with Sidney until Sir Philip's death, although their friendship was severely strained on their Italian journey by an unfounded charge of robbery brought by Sidney against Coningsby. Coningsby went to Normandy in attendance on the Earl of Essex in 1591, and took part in the siege of Rouen, fighting against the forces of the league. He acted as muster-master to the English detachment, was in frequent intercourse with Henry of Navarre before Rouen, and was knighted by Essex on 8 October 1591. Coningsby was High Sheriff of Herefordshire in 1582 and 1598 and knight of the shire (MP) for Herefordshire in 1593, 1597 and 1601.

In March 1601 Coningsby wrote to Sir Robert Cecil to dispute the appointment of Herbert Croft as Steward of Leominster. His father had been Steward, he had a house at Leominster Priory and another in the town, and an election for the position had been planned. Coningsby expected Cecil to help because his wife, Philippa, was his kinswoman.

Anne of Denmark
Following the Union of the Crowns in 1603, Coningsby was appointed to a committee managing the jointure lands in England of Anne of Denmark. He would report on the queen's manors in Herefordshire and Worcestershire, including Kingsland, Marden, Westharness (Leominster), Stockton (Herefs), Stoke (Herefs), Leominster, Ivington and Hope (near Leominster), and Kings Norton. Coningsby and the other councillors were invited to come to court to kiss the queen's hand and receive their instructions when the plague had subsided. A portrait of his daughter Anne has an inscription mentioning that she was a maid of honour to the queen. After Anne of Denmark died in 1619 the Leominster manors were given to the Marquess of Buckingham.

Later life

On 12 Nov. 1617 he joined the council of Wales under the presidency of William, Lord Compton. In 1614 Coningsby founded a hospital in the suburbs of Hereford for superannuated soldiers and servants called 'Coningsby's Company of Old Servitors', this is now open on Wednesday's and Saturdays from Easter to September and is free to visit and you can learn about Thomas Coningsby and his impact on the site.

Thomas Coningsby died on 30 May 1625, aged 74.

Sir Thomas married Philippa, second daughter of Sir William Fitzwilliam of Milton, near Peterborough, and Sir Philip Sidney's cousin, by whom he had six sons and three daughters. All his sons except one died before him. His children included:
Fitzwilliam Coningsby, who married Cicely, daughter of Henry Nevill, 9th Baron Bergavenny, their son Humphrey married Lettice Loftus, and was the father of Thomas Coningsby, 1st Earl Coningsby
Katharine Coningsby, who married Francis Smallman of Kinnersley Castle, Herefordshire
Elizabeth Coningsby, who married Sir Humphrey Baskerville of Eardisley Castle, Herefordshire
Anne Coningsby, who married in 1608 Sir Richard Tracy (died 1638) of Hatfield or Hasfield and Stanway, Gloucestershire.

Diary
Coningsby is the author of a diary of the action of the English troops in France in 1591. It proceeds day by day through two periods, 13 August to 6 September, and 3 October to 24 December, when it abruptly terminates. The original manuscript is among the Harleian Manuscripts at the British Library. It was first printed and carefully edited by J. G. Nichols in the first volume of the Camden Society's Miscellanies (1847). Internal evidence alone gives the clue to the authorship.

Notes

References

External links
Journal of the siege of Rouen, 1591 - Coningsby's diary, from the Internet Archive

Year of birth unknown
1625 deaths
English soldiers
English diarists
High Sheriffs of Herefordshire
17th-century English writers
17th-century English male writers
16th-century English soldiers
English MPs 1593
English MPs 1597–1598
English MPs 1601
1550 births
Expatriates of the Kingdom of England in France